Wang Maolin (born December 1934) is a Chinese politician. He was born in Qidong, Jiangsu. He joined the Chinese Communist Party in 1956. He was mayor (1982–1985) and Communist Party Secretary (1985–1987) of Taiyuan. He was Communist Party Secretary (1991–1993) and CPPCC Committee Chairman (1993) of Shanxi. He was Communist Party Secretary (1993–1999) and People's Congress Chairman (1998) of Hunan.

Wang was the inaugural head of the 610 Office, in charge of suppressing Falun Gong.

References

1934 births
People's Republic of China politicians from Jiangsu
Chinese Communist Party politicians from Jiangsu
Delegates to the 10th National People's Congress
CPPCC Committee Chairmen of Shanxi
Members of the 13th Central Committee of the Chinese Communist Party
Members of the 14th Central Committee of the Chinese Communist Party
Members of the 15th Central Committee of the Chinese Communist Party
Vice-governors of Shanxi
Living people
People from Qidong, Jiangsu
Politicians from Nantong